The 2007–08 Cal State Fullerton Titans men's basketball team represented California State University, Fullerton during the 2007–08 NCAA Division I men's basketball season. The Titans, led by head coach Bob Burton, played their home games at the Titan Gym, in Fullerton, California, as members of the Big West Conference. They finished the season 24–9, 12–4 in Big West play to finish in fourth place. In the championship game of the Big West tournament, they defeated UC Irvine to win the tournament and receive the conference's automatic bid to the NCAA tournament – the school’s first appearance in 30 years. As the No. 14 seed in the Midwest region, they lost to Wisconsin in the first round.

Roster

Schedule and results

|-
!colspan=9 style=| Non-conference regular season

|-
!colspan=9 style=| Big West regular season

|-
!colspan=9 style=| Big West tournament

|-
!colspan=9 style=| NCAA tournament

Source:

References

Cal State Fullerton Titans men's basketball seasons
Cal State Fullerton
Cal State Fullerton Titans men's basketball
Cal State Fullerton Titans men's basketball
Cal State Fullerton